The 1934 UK & Ireland Greyhound Racing Year was the ninth year of greyhound racing in the United Kingdom and Ireland.

Roll of honour

Summary
The 1934 Betting and Lotteries Act came into force which limited the number of racing days held at tracks but enabled totalisators to be used. The latter was particularly welcomed by the industry because they were very profitable. Each track was to hold no more than 104 meetings per year.

The industry continued to grow with an estimated 270 tracks (licensed and independent) in operation during 1934 and attendances surpassing 20 million for the third successive year. However unlike previous years only a handful of new tracks were opened. The 1934 English Greyhound Derby saw the likes of Wild Woolley, Brilliant Bob and Davesland compete with the eventual winner being Davesland trained by Jack Harvey.

News
Arthur Elvin, owner of Wembley built the Empire Pool to introduce ice hockey, ice shows, tennis and boxing. The Greyhound Racing Association's (GRA) Hook Estate and Kennels at Northaw became famous within the industry following the success of the greyhounds trained from the facility. The 140 acres of park and grassland had separate kennel ranges for each relevant race track in London. The trainers were issued with their own cottages and kennel staff had the use of leisure facilities whilst the kennel manager and veterinary surgeon lived in the main mansion on site. There was an animal medical facility and even a sun tanning room for the greyhounds.

Ireland
Harold's Cross Stadium was at last granted permission to run the Irish Greyhound Derby with the proviso that they contributed a minimum of £100 towards the event. The Irish Coursing Club added a further £50. It was also agreed that Shelbourne Park and Harold's Cross would run the competition in alternate years. The 1934 Irish Greyhound Derby consisted of nine first round heats with two qualifiers from each forming three semi-finals. The eventual winner was Frisco Hobo trained by Tom Harty.

Competitions
The first classic of the year was the Gold Collar and Davesland, a 7-1 shot, won the final from the 1932 English Greyhound Derby champion Wild Woolley, now under the care of Harry Woolner. Coming home third was Gradual Rise for Harris at Harringay, this greyhound had broken the track record in the first round recording 32.32. Lemonition won the Grand National from the favourite Goodly News, the latter had recorded the fastest times in all three rounds leading up to the final. Former winners Long Hop and Scapegoat were both knocked out in earlier rounds, Long Hop would retire with a record of 49 wins from 85 races and a sixteen win sequence to his name.

The remainder of the year was all about Brilliant Bob, who on 14 July won the Cesarewitch, defeating hot favourite Lutwyche and three weeks later he won the Scurry Gold Cup defeating defending champion Creamery Border in the final. His consistency was evident and he won the Scurry by virtue of three straight wins in times of 23.48, 23.42 and 23.47. On the same night Wild Woolley broke the track record in a match race against Bella's Brother. Brilliant Bob then completed a treble by winning the Laurels. This treble was over distances from 400 to 600 yards demonstrating an ability over all trips. However the Laurels victory was not without incident because the first semi-final on 24 August was won in a track record time of 28.32 by Davesland from Brilliant Bob by seven lengths. In the second semi-final Creamery Border was disqualified for fighting with the re-run held a day later than the first semi-final. The re-run went to Bella's Brother and when Creamery Border returned, after injury and an enforced rest, he broke the track record at Wimbledon over 500 yards in 28.29 seconds. This win was even more significant because he beat Brilliant Bob by eight lengths.

Tracks opened

Principal UK races

Key
U = unplaced
+ = Track Record

References 

Greyhound racing in the United Kingdom
Greyhound racing in the Republic of Ireland
Greyhound Racing Year
Greyhound Racing Year
Greyhound Racing Year
Greyhound Racing Year